In cave diving, a Torricellian chamber is a cave chamber with an airspace above the water at less than atmospheric pressure. This is formed when the water level drops and there is no way for more air to get into the chamber. In theory such chambers could pose a risk of decompression sickness to divers, similar to flying after diving. Also, in a Torricellian chamber the diver's depth gauge is unlikely to give an accurate reading of pressure as most depth gauges are not designed to show depths less than zero.

The chambers are named after Evangelista Torricelli, inventor of the barometer.

External links

http://www.speleogenesis.info/glossary/glossary_by_letter.php?Authors=t (scroll down to alphabetical order)
 (scroll down to alphabetical order)

Cave diving
Underwater diving physics